Carly Brook Schroeder (born October 18, 1990) is an American actress and U.S. Army officer. She is best known for playing Serena Baldwin, the daughter of Scotty Baldwin and Lucy Coe in the General Hospital spin-off Port Charles. She also had a recurring role on the Disney Channel's Lizzie McGuire. In 2007, she played the lead in Gracie, a film inspired by a real-life tragedy during the childhood of sibling actors Elisabeth and Andrew Shue.

In February 2019, Schroeder announced that she would be joining the United States Army. She attended Officer Candidate School, graduating with a commission as a Second Lieutenant on September 20, 2019. She is currently an Infantry Officer with the rank of First Lieutenant.

Life and career

Schroeder was born in Valparaiso, Indiana. Carly's younger brother, Hunter Schroeder, is a former actor; he appeared with her in Gracie and Eye of the Dolphin prior to his current career in the U.S. Marine Corps. Her parents Paul and Kelli  currently reside in Ventura County, California. In 1993, while accompanying a cousin to an acting audition, the casting director asked if the cute three-year-old would consider working for them. Initially, her mother was hesitant about the question, but things such as money for a college education began to appeal to her. After her first job as a child print model, she began doing print work in Chicago for Sears, Roebuck and Company, Kmart, Spiegel, Lands' End, Chuck E. Cheese's and many other print advertisers. Two years later in 1995, child director Bob Ebel asked her to do a few television commercials. One of her first commercials was for Birthday Party Barbie in 1998.

In 1997, American Broadcasting Company (ABC) hired Schroeder to play Serena Baldwin on Port Charles. She was twice nominated for a Young Artist Award for her work on the show; once in 1999 and again in 2000, as well as a Young Star Award nomination in 1999 for Best Performance by a Young Actress in a Daytime TV Program. Schroeder then appeared as Melina Bianco in The Disney Channel's Lizzie McGuire. Originally booked as a one-time appearance, she shot twelve episodes of the show and also appeared in The Lizzie McGuire Movie in 2003, in the same role.

In 2003, Schroeder auditioned for her first feature film and won the role of Millie in the thriller Mean Creek. The movie won wide acclaim for Schroeder and the rest of the cast, winning the Humanitas Prize at the 2004 Sundance Film Festival, and also being awarded the 2005 Independent Spirit Festival Special Distinction Award for best ensemble cast.

Gracie was Shroeder's next film role, in 2006. In order to win the role, she began an intense three-month work-out that included a daily regimen of not only physical fitness, but also of training in advanced soccer skills with professional athletes and trainers.
While Gracie was in theaters, Schroeder's other movie, Eye of the Dolphin, was receiving attention, winning two awards from the 2007 International Family Film Festival: a Best Child Actor win for Schroeder, and a Drama Feature win for the movie. The movie has been well received and continues to receive honors, including being named as an Official Selection for the Tribeca Film Festival, Delray Beach Film Festival, Kids First! Film Festival, Tiburon Film Festival, USA Family Film Festival and the Worldfest Houston Film festival. At the 2007 Kids First Awards in October, Schroeder received the award for Best Emerging Actress, while the film received the Best Feature Award (ages 12–18).
Her other movies are Forget Me Not (2009), and Slightly Single in L.A., which completed filming in 2009 and was released in 2012. She was also featured in Creepers (2011) and Prep School (2015).

Schroeder graduated from Thousand Oaks High School in June 2009, and graduated from California Lutheran University in 2014 with a double major in communications and psychology, and a minor in theater.

In early July 2017, it was announced that Schroeder would return as Serena Baldwin to General Hospital to honor the late Peter Hansen, who had died in April 2017, who had portrayed her grandfather, Lee Baldwin.

Filmography

Film

Television

Awards
 Special Distinction Award at Independent Spirit Awards for Mean Creek (2004)
 Best Child Actor Award at Int. Family Film Festival for Eye of the Dolphin (2007)
 Best Emerging Actress at 2007 Kids First! Awards for Eye of the Dolphin
 Best Actress at 2015 Studio City Film Festival for Prep School

Notes

References

External links

 

1990 births
20th-century American actresses
21st-century American actresses
Actresses from Indiana
American child actresses
American film actresses
American soap opera actresses
American television actresses
Living people
People from Valparaiso, Indiana
California Lutheran University alumni
United States Army officers